Mount Vernon High School (MVHS) is a high school in Mount Vernon, Washington, located at 1075 E Fulton St. The school was originally known as Mount Vernon Union High School.

It is noted for its music program, which has won numerous local awards. It has been pioneered by Omar Ordonez, Daisy Cardona-Kay, and Jacob Scherr.  www.mv-music.org.

Athletics

Gymnasium & Field House 

Built in 1951, the Mount Vernon High School gymnasium features original wooden bleachers and other classic architectural features.

In 2003 the MVHS gym was ranked first among twenty of the state's top high school gymnasiums by the Seattle Times. The story referred to it as "the gold standard of high-school gymnasiums" and "the Sistine Chapel of Washington gyms".

Basketball 

The Mount Vernon boys basketball team found major success under Mac Fraser, head coach from 1986–2001, who was elected into the Washington Interscholastic Basketball Coaches Association Hall of Fame in 2005.

The Bulldogs won consecutive WIAA Class 3A state titles in 1991 and 1992 lead by future NBA player Mark Hendrickson. In 2000 the Bulldogs lost in the state title game to Seattle Prep, but returned the next year to defeat Rainier Beach for the 2001 title. The Bulldogs were undefeated in 1991 and 2001.

Notable alumni 
 Lawrence Colburn, United States Army helicopter crew member who intervened to stop the Mỹ Lai massacre.
 Craig Kelly, pioneer snowboarder.
 Ross Mathews, "Ross the Intern" on the Tonight Show, tv host and television personality.
 Chad Lindberg, film and television actor.
 Kyle Kendrick, MLB pitcher and 2008 World Series champion.
 Jim Caviezel, film and television actor.
 Mark Hendrickson, NBA player and MLB pitcher.
 Grant Leep, Head men's basketball coach at Seattle Pacific University.
 Cheryl Bentyne, singer with The Manhattan Transfer.

References

External links 
 

High schools in Skagit County, Washington
Public high schools in Washington (state)